Daniel Crerand (born 5 May 1969) is an English former professional footballer who played as a midfielder.

Career
After playing for his local non-League team Chapel Villa, Crerand signed for Football League side Rochdale on non-contract terms, making three appearances in the 1987–88 season. He later returned to non-League football with Altrincham.

Personal life
His father Pat was also a professional footballer, as was a second cousin Charlie Gallagher.

References

1969 births
Living people
English footballers
Rochdale A.F.C. players
Altrincham F.C. players
English Football League players
English people of Scottish descent
English people of Irish descent
Association football midfielders